The women's discus throw event at the 2007 European Athletics U23 Championships was held in Debrecen, Hungary, at Gyulai István Atlétikai Stadion on 12 and 13 July.

Medalists

Results

Final
13 July

†: Darya Pishchalnikova ranked initially 2nd (64.15m), but was disqualified later for infringement of IAAF doping rules.

Qualifications
12 July
Qualifying 54.00 or 12 best to the Final

Group A

†: Darya Pishchalnikova initially reached the final (57.43m), but was disqualified later for infringement of IAAF doping rules.

Group B

Participation
According to an unofficial count, 21 athletes from 15 countries participated in the event.

 (1)
 (2)
 (1)
 (1)
 (1)
 (1)
 (3)
 (1)
 (1)
 (1)
 (2)
 (1)
 (2)
 (1)
 (2)

References

Discus throw
Discus throw at the European Athletics U23 Championships